The New Zealand  DE class locomotive is a New Zealand class of shunting diesel-electric locomotives. The New Zealand Railways intended to replace steam locomotives for shunting duties with this class. They are physically similar to the Tasmanian Government Railways X class, which were also of English Electric design.

Introduction
Although NZR intended to use the class as a heavy transfer shunter, four of the DEs were used in pairs (each locomotive crewed) on 1953—1954 Royal Train tour when Queen Elizabeth II visited New Zealand. The DEs was trialled for use on suburban passenger trains in Auckland and Wellington as well as on lesser regional passenger services and branch line freight. The class was also the first to use the new Murupara Branch; for construction then for log trains on the still unsettled track bed. This has given the DE class an unofficial status of the first mainline diesel-electric locomotive in NZR service, a title correctly applied to another English Electric class, the DF class of 1954.

The class was initially based in the North Island, but four of the class were sent to the South Island in 1981. The class was slowly dispersed to secondary yards on the New Zealand network, such as Napier, Dunedin and Invercargill. In the early 1980s, two DE class members received English Electric 6SRKT Mk 2 engines (which were fitted to the DG class locomotives).

Withdrawal and Preservation
As part of the New Zealand Railways Corporation plan to reduce the number of first-generation diesels in the late 1980s, a number of the class were scrapped or sold for preservation.

Seven DE class locomotives have survived out of the original fifteen. All have operated in preservation at least once time:

 DE 504/DE 1337 was sold to the Otago Polytechnic not long after being withdrawn.  It was intended to use the engine in the locomotive for a recreation of a ships engine room. This never happened and the became surplus to their requirements in 1993 when it was gifted to the Otago Excursion Train Trust, who restored it to working order as DE 1337 and repainted in the TGRs Bahama Blue livery. It was repainted in 2006 to the original red livery with Larch Yellow nose stripes and wasp stripes on the headstocks as per the 1970s. DE 504 is not mainline certified. It sees occasional use pulling work trains and sometimes passenger excursions, but mostly can be see shunting in Dunedin Railways yard. It was put up for sale or leasing in mid-2015, but is still operational and can be seen being used for shunting around their depot occasionally.
 DE 505/DE 1343 was sold to the Silver Stream Railway in 1984. It was one of two class members that did not receive the International Orange livery, instead bearing its original red livery with its head-stocks painted yellow until withdrawal. It is still in service on the SSR, albeit in its original livery but with the head-stocks repainted to black.
 DE 507/DE 1372/GVR No.8 was sold to the Glenbrook Vintage Railway in 1988. It has since been repainted into its original livery and wears its original identity as DE 507 and GVR NO 8 in preservation.
 DE 508/DE 1389 was brought to Wellington after withdrawal and restored by NZ Rail to become DE 508 in their Heritage Fleet. During this time it did some shunting work at Wellingtons carriage and wagon depot, and undertook some railfan trips. In 2003, Tranz Rail decided to disperse the Heritage Fleet with the result that the loco was given to the Rail Heritage Trust and moved to the Silver Stream Railway. The locomotive is still operational, and runs on SSR open days. It was fitted with a replica of its original cow-catcher in early 2014.
 DE 509/DE 1395 was sold to the Glenbrook Vintage Railway in 1988. It kept its TMS identity as DE 1395 and its International Orange livery as it did not spend much time in service for its new owners, but instead ended up in storage by 1990 without ever carrying its new identity as GVR NO 9. This locomotive is the last surviving Royal Train DE.
 DE 511/DE 1412 was sold to the Diesel Traction Group in 1988. It was restored as DE 511 and journeyed with DG 772 to Springfield on an excursion as part of the Rail 125 celebrations in 1988. The locomotive is currently undergoing repairs after being in storage.
 DE 512/DE 1429 was sold to the Diesel Traction Group in 1988. It was restored as DE 1429, and has been the only operational DE to wear the International Orange livery in preservation. The locomotive still saw occasional use at Ferrymead, and has in the past attended the famous Waipara Vintage Festivals hosted by the Weka Pass Railway. The locomotive has been on long-term loan to the WPR since September 2015.

References

Footnotes

Citations

Bibliography

External links
 Diesel Traction Group, Christchurch

DE class
English Electric locomotives
Bo-Bo locomotives
3 ft 6 in gauge locomotives of New Zealand
Railway locomotives introduced in 1952